The Brazilian Naval Revolts, or the Revoltas da Armada (in Portuguese), were armed mutinies promoted mainly by admirals Custódio José de Melo and Saldanha da Gama and their fleet of rebel Brazilian navy ships against the claimed unconstitutional staying in power of president Floriano Peixoto.

First revolt

In November 1891, President Marshal Deodoro da Fonseca, amid a political crisis compounded by the effects of an economic crisis, in flagrant violation of the new constitution, decided to "solve" the political crisis by ordering the closure of Congress, supported mainly by the Paulista oligarchy. The Navy, still resentful of the circumstances and outcomes of the coup that had put an end to the monarchy in Brazil, under the leadership of admiral Custódio José de Melo, rose up and threatened to bombard the city of Rio de Janeiro, then the capital of Brazil. To avoid a civil war, marshal Deodoro resigned the presidency in 23 November.
With the resignation of Deodoro, after just nine months from the beginning of his administration, vice president Floriano Peixoto took office. The 1891 Constitution, however, provided for a new election if the presidency or vice-presidency became vacant sooner than two years in office. The opposition then accused Floriano of staying as head of the nation illegally.

Second revolt
The second revolt started in March 1892, when thirteen generals sent a letter and manifesto to the President Marshal Floriano Peixoto. This document demanded new elections be called to fulfill the constitutional provision and ensure internal tranquility in the nation. Floriano harshly suppressed the movement, ordering the arrest of their leaders. Thus, not legally solved, the political tensions increased.  The revolt broke out in September 1893 at Rio de Janeiro, and was suppressed only in March 1894 after a long blockade of the city.

With many of the Brazilian Navy's most powerful ships either in the hands of the rebels or under repair, the Brazilian government had to improvise a new fleet to battle the rebel fleet. The "paper fleet", as it was called, had to face off against a mutiny that had overtaken most of the powerful ships of the original navy. Local bloody conflicts in some regions of Brazil ensued. The navy's mutiny off Rio de Janeiro, in the Guanabara Bay, was also a challenge, and became linked to the Federalist Revolution in southern Brazil.

The revolt included the powerful battleship Aquidabã and a collection of small ironclads, modern cruisers and older wood "cruiser" or steam frigate type ships. Two of the navy's major ships were overseas and supposedly away from the conflict: the battleship Riachuelo was under repairs in France, and the corvette Barrozo was on a round-the world training voyage (during which she sank). This did not leave the government with much left to challenge the mutineers, who could have controlled the seas and influenced the concurrent conflicts on land.

The government basically bought itself a new naval force on the open markets, of small and sometimes unusual ships including torpedo gunboats, various medium and small torpedo boats, small armed yachts, and a transport converted to carry a Zalinski dynamite gun (a pneumatic gun launching a dynamite charge of massive explosive force and marginal accuracy). Such improvised stocking up was common at that time: the US pressed a similar mix of ships into action to supplement its fleet in the 1898 war with Spain (or to buy them before Spain could), and Japan also scrambled to purchase available ships for its conflict with Russia in 1904-5. In this case, however, the new fleet was dedicated to confronting the original navy of the same country.

Details of conflict
On 13 September, the fortresses in Rio de Janeiro, held by the Army, began to be bombarded. The rebel forces' fleet consisted of navy vessels and civilian vessels of Brazilian and foreign companies.

The rebels were the majority in the Navy, but faced strong opposition in the Army, where thousands of young soldiers joined the battalions that supported president Floriano Peixoto. State elites, especially in São Paulo, were also in favor of Floriano.

At the same time, in southern Brazil, the Federalist Revolution against the government was taking place, a dispute between the federalists (nicknamed maragatos) and republicans (nicknamed pica-paus), the latter supported by president Floriano. The city of Desterro, as the capital of Santa Catarina state was then called, was dominated by the rebels. At dawn on 1 December, admiral Custódio de Melo, in the Aquidabã, followed by the República and auxiliary cruisers, went south to join forces with the federalists.

On 7 December, rear admiral Luis Filipe Saldanha da Gama, then director of the Naval School, joined the movement, taking over the rebels in Rio de Janeiro, beginning the second phase of the Navy Revolt. By this time, the rebels had little ammunition and no food. The São José Fortress, on Cobras Island, was practically destroyed by the loyalist troops. On 9 February 1894, the rebels, under the command of Saldanha da Gama, landed at Ponta da Armação, in the city of Niterói, but were defeated. They were also defeated in Governador Island.

Niterói, which was the capital of the state of Rio de Janeiro, had its seven forts bombed. On 20 February 1894, the seat of government was then moved to Petrópolis, a mountain town beyond the reach of the Navy guns. Niterói would not return to host the capital in 1903.

The federal government had acquired warships, which were dubbed the "paper fleet". The command of this squadron was given to admiral Jerônimo Gonçalves, a veteran of the Paraguayan War. In March 1894, with the support of the Army and the Paulista Republican Party (PRP), the Navy Revolt was stifled. The rebels took refuge in the Portuguese ships Mindelo and Afonso de Albuquerque, ending the second phase of the revolt.

The Federalist Revolution continued in the south, where Saldanha da Gama and his men were still leading troops against the government. Custódio de Melo had taken the port of Paranaguá and was united with the federalist leader Gumercindo Saraiva. They took the city of Lapa and the government troops moved south. On 16 April 1894, the rebel battleship Aquidabã was torpedoed in Santa Catarina by the torpedo-boat destroyer Gustavo Sampaio, which was commanded by lieutenant Altino Flávio de Miranda Correia.

In the República cruiser, Custódio de Melo, commanding four merchant ships and two thousand men, unsuccessfully tried to land in the city of Rio Grande. He was defeated by troops loyal to the state governor Júlio de Castilhos. The navy rebels were defeated. Custódio took refuge in Argentina, where he delivered the ships. According to historian Helio Silva, the end of the third and final phase of the Armada Revolt happened with the death of Saldanha da Gama, on 25 June 1895, in the Battle of Campo Osório, in Rio Grande do Sul.

Photo gallery

Main ships involved in the conflict

Rebel Squad

 Battleship Aquidabã - Seriously damaged (disabled until the end of the conflict) by torpedo attack in combat against destroyer Gustavo de Sampaio in the Battle of Anhatomirim.
 Armored frigate Sete de Setembro - Sunk and burned during the Battle of Guanabara Bay.
 Protected cruiser Tamandaré
 Protected cruiser República
 Cruiser Trajano
 Gunboat Marajó - Sunk after fire during the Battle of Guanabara Bay.
 Monitor Alagoas
 Monitor Javary - Sunk by coastal artillery (Fortress São João) during the Battle of Guanabara Bay.
 Torpedoboat Marcílio Dias
 Torpedoboat Iguatemi
 Torpedoboat Araguari
 Auxiliary cruiser Pereira da Cunha - Sunk by coastal artillery (Fort Gragoatá) after explosion of its ammunition stockpile, killing all crew, Battle of Ponta da Armação (Niterói).
 Transport Ship Madeira - Sunk by coastal artillery (Fort Gragoatá) during the Battle of Ponta da Armação (Niterói).
 Transport Ship Palas - Sunk after collision with a rock in Battle of Anhatomirim.

Loyalist Squad

 Cruiser Tiradentes
 Cruiser Parnaiba
 Destroyer Gustavo Sampaio
 Monitor Solimões
 Gunboat Cananéia - Sunk by rebel Cruiser República in combat, southern Brazil.
 Gunboat Piratini - Sunk in combat against Rebel Squad in Salvador, Bahia.
 Auxiliary cruiser Nichteroy
 Torpedoboat Pedro Ivo
 Torpedoboat Pedro Affonso
 Torpedoboat Silvado
 Torpedoboat Bento Gonçalves - Seriously damaged in combat against the rebel battleship Aquidabã in Battle of Anhatomirim.
 Torpedoboat Sabino Vieira
 Torpedoboat Tamborim
 Transport ship  Itaipu

See also
Brazilian Navy
Rebellions and revolutions in Brazil

References

External links

First Brazilian Republic
Military history of Brazil
Naval mutinies
1893 in Brazil
1894 in Brazil
Blockades
Rebellions in Brazil